Oh, My Nerves is a 1935 American short comedy film directed by Del Lord. It was nominated for an Academy Award at the 8th Academy Awards, held in March 1936, for Best Short Subject (Comedy). The Academy Film Archive preserved Oh, My Nerves in 2012.

Cast
 Monte Collins as Monty (as Monty Collins)
 Tom Kennedy as Tom
 Ruth Hiatt
 Elaine Waters
 Tommy Bond
 Charles Dorety
 Valerie Hall
 James C. Morton
 Richard Allen
 Lew Davis
 June Gittelson
 Jay Healey
 Sam Lufkin
 Al Thompson

Remakes
Oh, My Nerves was remade with The Three Stooges as Idiots Deluxe and Guns a Poppin.

References

External links

1935 films
1935 comedy films
1935 short films
1930s English-language films
Columbia Pictures short films
American black-and-white films
Films directed by Del Lord
American comedy short films
1930s American films